Indonesian and Standard Malay are two standardised varieties of the Malay language, used officially in Indonesia (and in Timor Leste as a working language) on one hand and in Brunei, Malaysia and Singapore on the other. Both varieties are generally mutually intelligible, yet there are noticeable differences in spelling, grammar, pronunciation and vocabulary, as well as the predominant source of loanwords. The differences can range from those mutually unintelligible with one another, to those having a closer familial resemblance. The regionalised and localised varieties of Malay can become a catalyst for intercultural conflict, especially in higher education.

Perception
To non-native speakers the two varieties may seem identical, but to native speakers the differences are noticeable through both diction and accent. They affect the broadcasting industry with regard to foreign language subtitling, for example, in DVD movies and on cable TV. In order to reach a wider audience, both Indonesian and Malay subtitles are sometimes displayed in a movie, along with other language subtitles. Another example is Malaysian TV providing Malay subtitling on Indonesian sinetrons (TV dramas) aired in Malaysia (but, in Malaysian and Bruniean languages is "teledrama"), and vice versa.

The Malay language in Indonesia and Malaysia also differs in recognition, where in Malaysia it enjoys status as the national language (Malaysian language), while in Indonesia it is considered a regional language in Malay-speaking areas such as the eastern coast of Sumatra and West Kalimantan. The term "Malay language" (Bahasa Melayu) in Indonesia and Malaysia invites different perceptions from its respective people. To Malaysians, the Malay language is generally understood as the national language of Malaysia, with Malaysian language (Bahasa Malaysia) being a precise appellation for the Malay variety used in the country. Between 1986 and 2007, the term Bahasa Melayu was used instead of Bahasa Malaysia, until the latter was reinstated, in order to instill a sense of belonging among Malaysians of all races, rather than just Malays. Therefore, there was no clear distinction between the use of the term Malay (Bahasa Melayu) and the national language of Malaysia (Bahasa Malaysia). In Brunei, where Malay is also an official language, the language is known as Bahasa Melayu and in English as "Malay".

In Indonesia, however, there is a clear distinction between "Malay language" (bahasa Melayu) and "Indonesian" (bahasa Indonesia). Indonesian is the national language which serves as the unifying language of Indonesia; despite being a standardized form of Malay, it is not referred to with the term "Malay" in common parlance. The term "Malay" is usually reserved for the forms of Malay indigenous to the Malay ethnic group (the national standardized language of Malaysia and the non-standard idioms of Malay people, including those used by Malay Indonesians). Thus, "Malay" is considered a regional language (bahasa daerah) in Indonesia, enjoying the same status as e.g. Javanese, Sundanese, Buginese, Balinese, Batak languages and others. Moreover, to some Indonesians, the term "Malay" is more often associated with Malaysia and the Malaysian variety of Malay.

In Malaysia, the terms "Indonesian Malay" and "Malaysian Malay" are sometimes used for Indonesian and Malay as spoken in Malaysia. In Indonesia, "Indonesian Malay" usually refers to the vernacular varieties of Malay spoken by the Malay peoples of Indonesia, that is, to Malay as a regional language in Sumatra, though it is rarely used. Bahasa Malaysia and Bahasa Melayu are used interchangeably in reference to Malay in Malaysia.

Malay was designated as a national language by the Singaporean government after independence from Britain in the 1960s to avoid friction with Singapore's Malay-speaking neighbours of Malaysia and Indonesia. It has a symbolic, rather than functional purpose. It is used in the national anthem "Majulah Singapura", in citations of Singaporean orders and decorations and in military commands. Singaporean Malay is officially written in the Latin-based Rumi script, though some Singaporean Malays also learn the Arabic-based Jawi script. Jawi is considered an ethnic script for use on Singaporean identity cards.

Orthography

Before the 20th century, Malay was written in a local modified form of the Arabic alphabet known as Jawi. During the 20th century, Malay written with Roman letters, known as Rumi, almost completely replaced Jawi in everyday life. The romanisations originally used in British Malaya (now part of Malaysia) and the Dutch East Indies (now Indonesia) reflected their history as British and Dutch colonial possessions respectively. In British Malaya, the romanisation of Malay, devised by Richard Wilkinson was influenced by English, whereas in the Dutch East Indies, the system devised by C. A. Van Ophuijsen was influenced by Dutch. As a result, in Indonesia, the vowel  was formerly represented oe, as in Dutch, although the official spelling of this sound was changed to u in 1947 when the Republican Spelling System was used.

Similarly, until 1972,  was represented in Malaysia as ch, whereas in Indonesia, it continued to follow Dutch and used tj. Indonesia abandoned the spelling dj  to conform to the j already in use in Malaysia, while the old Indonesian j for the semivowel  was replaced with y as in Malaysia. Likewise, the velar fricative  which occurs in many Arabic loanwords, which used to be written 'ch' in Indonesian, became kh in both languages. However, oe was retained in some proper names, such as the name of the former vice-president, Boediono or former minister Mohammad Roem. The ch and dj letter combinations are still encountered in names such as Achmad and Djojo (pronounced as Akhmad and Joyo respectively), although the post-1972 spelling is now favoured.

One notable difference in punctuation between the two languages is the use of different decimal marks; Indonesian, influenced by Dutch, uses the decimal comma, whereas Malay, influenced by English, uses the decimal point.

Pronunciation

Pronunciation also tends to be very different, with East Malaysia, Brunei and East Indonesia pronouncing words in a form called Bahasa Baku, where the words are pronounced as spelled. Moreover, enunciation tends to be clipped, staccato and faster than on the Malay Peninsula, which is spoken at a more languorous pace.

Vocabulary

 Vocabulary differences 

Indonesian and Malay both differ in the forms of loanwords used as the Malay Archipelago was divided by long-lasting colonial influences between the Dutch and British as a consequence of the Anglo-Dutch Treaty of 1824: Indonesian absorbed primarily Dutch loanwords whereas Malay absorbed primarily English words. Pronunciation of certain loanwords in Standard Malay follows English, while in Indonesian it follows Dutch, for example Malay "" (from English: television) and Indonesian ""; the "-syen" and "-si" also prevail in some other words, though "-si" has become more preferred in Malay of late.

Malay has also experienced significant conservative pushback as precedent entities that existed within the British sphere made efforts to create words that would fit naturally foreign ideas of governance and thought through a Malay-oriented context. The Pakatan Belajar Mengajar Pengetahuan Bahasa in Johore headed by Abdul Rahman Andak during the 19th century was especially important in introducing neologisms like pejabat ("office", cf. Indonesian kantor from ) and setiausaha ("secretary", cf. Indo sekretaris from ) into the Malay lexicon. For example, the word for 'post office' in Malaysia is "" (in Indonesia this means 'post officer'), whereas in Indonesia it is "".

There are also some Portuguese influences: in Indonesia, Christmas is known as "", whereas Malaysia uses both "Natal" and "", the latter derived from English. There are also instances where the Malay version derives from English pronunciation while the Indonesian version takes its cue from Latin.

Some words which are spelt the same in both languages may even carry entirely different meanings in the other language, potentially leading to humorous or embarrassing situations: while  means "steel" in Indonesian, in Malay it means "fertiliser". Also, whereas the Indonesian word  (from Sundanese ᮘᮥᮒᮥᮂ butuh) means "require" or "need", in Malay, it is a vulgar slang term equivalent to "cunt/cock". Conversely, where the word "" seems innocuous enough in Malaysia ("census"), in Indonesia it is a derogatory term for "transvestite".

The relatively large share of Islamic (Arabic or Persian) loan words shared by Malay and Indonesian often poses no difficulty in comprehension and usage, although some forms may have developed a (slightly) different meaning or have become obsolete either in Malay or in Indonesian, e.g. ,  (see below).

 Vocabulary comparison 

A

B

C

D

E

F

G

H

I

J

K–L

M

N

O

P

Q–R

S

T

U

V

W

Y–Z

 False friends 
Besides vocabulary differences, there are also a number of false friends in both languages. As these words are in quite common use in either or both of the languages, misunderstandings can arise.

 Same words, same meaning, but different forms 

Syllabification

Influence from English
One of the most important aspect in differences between Malay (Malaysian and Brunei) and Indonesian is the degree of influence from English. Apart from being heavily influenced by the Dutch language, the Indonesian language also adopted a significant number of English loanwords in its vocabulary, although English did not play significant role on the Indonesian language and in fact most of these vocabulary are of Dutch origin – Dutch and English share a similar Germanic origin, and Dutch has also borrowed from Latin, although to a lesser extent than English. There have been many changes in Indonesian as a result of its historical development. Words have been freely borrowed from English and only partly assimilated, in many cases, to the Indonesian patterns of structure.

Many loanwords from English sometimes fulfill no communicative need, expressing concepts adequately covered by existing words.

ExampleThe original text in Indonesian:
    ,            .The same text rendered in Malay (Malaysian and Brunei):
  ,        10    .English translation:
If the European stability pact rules had been respected in detail, the ratio of public debt to gross domestic product on the days of crisis would have been at the position 10 percentage points less in the eurozone, he said.

Convergence of vocabulary
The rift of evolution between the two languages is based more on political nuance and the history of their formation than on cultural reasons. As a result, views regarding each other's languages differ amongst Malaysians and Indonesians. In Malaysia, the national language is Malay; in Indonesia, it is Indonesian. Malaysians tend to assert that Malay and Indonesian are merely different varieties of the same language, while Indonesians tend to treat them as separate – albeit closely related – languages. The result of this attitude is that the Indonesians feel little need to synchronize their language with Malaysia, Singapore and Brunei, whereas the Malaysians are keener to coordinate the evolution of the language with the Indonesians. However, both parties have realized that communication benefits from mutually comprehensible and intelligible languages, which motivated efforts to synchronize the languages' development. The effort to synchronize both languages' evolution to increase their mutual intelligibility has been embarked by imposing standard rules of language. This process is headed by Badan Pengembangan dan Pembinaan Bahasa on the Indonesian side and Dewan Bahasa dan Pustaka as its Malaysian counterpart. Authorities in both Brunei and Singapore generally abide by the Malaysian standard in disputes.

Sample
The following texts are excerpts from the official translations of the Universal Declaration of Human Rights in Indonesian and Malay (Malaysian and Brunei), along with the original declaration in English.

 Indonesian text sample:  :
, ..

 The original English version of the text:
Now, therefore,the General Assembly proclaimsthis UNIVERSAL DECLARATION OF HUMAN RIGHTS as a common standard of achievement for all peoples and all nations, to the end that every individual and every organ of society, keeping this Declaration constantly in mind, shall strive by teaching and education to promote respect for these rights and freedoms and by progressive measures, national and international, to secure their universal and effective recognition and observance, both among the peoples of Member States themselves and among the peoples of territories under their jurisdiction.Article 1'''
All human beings are born free and equal in dignity and rights. They are endowed with reason and conscience and should act towards one another in a spirit of brotherhood.

See also
 Majlis Bahasa Brunei-Indonesia-Malaysia

References

External links
 
 Kamus Besar Bahasa Indonesia. 2008. Pusat Bahasa, Departemen Pendidikan Nasional
 Regina Pasys, "Ternyata 4 Negara Ini Mempunya Bahasa yang Mirip dengan Bahasa Indonesia, Sudah Tahu?", Grid Kids'', https://kids.grid.id/read/472255841/keren-ternyata-4-negara-ini-mempunya-bahasa-yang-mirip-dengan-bahasa-indonesia-sudah-tahu?page=all (accessed in 5 Juli 2022 on 1:30 pm)
 Senarai komprehensif perbezaan ejaan Malaysia dan ejaan Indonesia, Hiroki Nomoto, Nahoko Yamashita, Ayano Osaka (orthographic differences between Standard Malay and Indonesian)

Malay language
Indonesian language
Language comparison
False friends
Indonesia–Malaysia relations